Vrdi is a village in the City of Mostar, Bosnia and Herzegovina.

Demographics 
According to the 2013 census, its population was 102, all Croats.

References

Populated places in Mostar
Villages in the Federation of Bosnia and Herzegovina